TIPA may refer to:

 TIPA (software), for typesetting IPA in TeX
 Tibetan Institute of Performing Arts, to preserve Tibetan artistic heritage
 Technical Image Press Association, an international association
 Tudor IT Process Assessment, a methodological framework for process assessment
 Triisopropanolamine, a chemical
 Tipa, a common name for the plant Tipuana tipu
 Tipa, samoan translation of the word juggernaut''
 Tipa, an alternate name for Tuipang, Mizoram, India
 Triple India pale ale, a style of beer

See also
 Tipper (disambiguation)